Dr. Pulin Bihari Baske is an Indian Politician and was Member of Parliament of the 15th Lok Sabha of India. He represented the Jhargram constituency of West Bengal and is a member of the Communist Party of India (Marxist) political party.

Early life and education
Pulin Baske was born in Dantan, (West Bengal). After completing MBBS from Kolkata Medical College, he started working as a Medical practitioner with Ramkrishna Mission Lok Shiksha Parisad in Narendrapur, West Bengal.

Political career
Pulin Baske was a first time M.P. Prior to this, he held other Zila Parishad posts.

Posts Held

See also

15th Lok Sabha
Politics of India
Parliament of India
Government of India
Communist Party of India (Marxist)
Jhargram (Lok Sabha constituency)

References 

India MPs 2009–2014
1968 births
Communist Party of India (Marxist) politicians from West Bengal
Lok Sabha members from West Bengal
People from Paschim Medinipur district
Living people
Communist Party of India (Marxist) candidates in the 2014 Indian general election
West Bengal district councillors